Warr Acres is a city in Oklahoma County, Oklahoma, United States, and a part of the  Oklahoma City metropolitan area. It was established after World War II by C.B. Warr, a dynamic businessman, builder, and commercial developer. The population was 10,043 at the 2010 census.

The city lies within the Putnam City School District.

History
The Warr Acres housing addition and Warr Acres Second Addition was developed in 1937 by Clyde B. Warr. An addition that would later form part of the city of Warr Acres, Putnam City was developed by state lawmaker Israel Putnam in 1909.

The city formed when the residents of 11 additions, including Putnam City, petitioned to incorporate in February 1948. The city of Bethany filed suit, but lost in an Oklahoma Supreme Court decision.

Shopping districts appeared along MacArthur Avenue in the 1960s and 1970s. By 1979, the town had grown to three square miles after annexing several residential developments.

Geography
Warr Acres is a northwest suburb of Oklahoma City.

Climate
Warr Acres has a humid subtropical climate, with variations in weather daily and seasonally, except during summer, which is consistently hot and humid. Central Oklahoma is subject to droughts and heavy rainfall leading to flash flooding and flooding. Consistent winds help cool the summers and can lead to winter ice storms. Warr Acres is in the center of Tornado Alley and is prone to frequent and severe tornadoes. The Oklahoma City metropolitan area is one of the most tornado-prone major cities in the world. More than 150 tornadoes have struck within the city limits since 1890, including eight rated F4/EF4 and one rated F5.

Demographics

According to the 2020 U.S. Census, the racial composition of Warr Acres was as follows:
 White American: 45.8%
 Hispanic or Latino: 29.1%
 African American: 10.3%
 Native American: 2.4%
 Asian American: 4.1%
 Pacific Islands American: 0.1%
 Some other race: 0.1%
 Multiracial American: 7.9%

As of the 2010 census, there were 10,043 people, 3,945 households, and 2,600 families residing in the city. The population density was 3,586.8 people per square mile. The population was relatively unchanged since the 2000 census recorded 9,735 people, 3,978 households, and 2,681 families. Households with children under the age of 18 make up 34.5% of the 3,945 households and 43.5% were occupied by married couples living together. Non-family households make up 33.9% of the total households and 16.4% were occupied by a female householder with no husband present. The average household size was 2.52 and the average family size was 3.07.

The median income for a household in the city was $40,941, and the median income for a family was $50,533. The per capita income for the city was $29,966. About 13.8% of families, 75.2% of employees and 16.6% of the population were below the poverty line, including 30.2% of those under age 18 and 3.3% of those age 65 or over.

City government

The city provides residents with a fire department, police department, animal control, and sewer and sanitation services. The Warr Acres fire department consists of 17 paid employees that respond to more than 5,200 calls per year. The police department consists of 26 paid employees divided up into patrol, investigative, communications, and administrative divisions. The Patrol Division is the primary contact for citizens.

Education
As a northwest suburb of Oklahoma City, Warr Acres is close to Oklahoma City University, the Southern Nazarene University, Southwestern Christian University and Oklahoma Christian University.

The city is serviced by the Putnam City School District.

References

Oklahoma City metropolitan area
Cities in Oklahoma County, Oklahoma
Cities in Oklahoma